Bucs or BUCS may refer to:

 British Universities and Colleges Sport, the governing body for university sport in the United Kingdom
 The Bucs, a nickname for the Pittsburgh Pirates, a US professional baseball team
 The Bucs, a nickname for the Tampa Bay Buccaneers, an American football team

See also
 Buchs (disambiguation)
 Bucks (disambiguation)
 Bux (disambiguation)